Armida is an opera in three acts by Italian composer Gioachino Rossini to an Italian libretto (dramma per musica) by Giovanni Schmidt, based on scenes from Gerusalemme liberata by Torquato Tasso.

Performance history
Armida was written to be performed at the Teatro di San Carlo, Naples, on 11 November 1817 to celebrate the opening  of the rebuilt opera house, which had been destroyed by fire the previous year. Isabella Colbran sang the title role, which is one of the longest and most demanding that Rossini wrote, with difficult coloratura passages of every kind during the entire opera. The most notable are to be found in "D'amore al dolce impero" during Act 2, in the duets between Armida and Rinaldo, and in parts of the Act 3 finale.

The first modern staging took place at the Teatro Comunale of Florence on 26 April 1952, during the Maggio Musicale Fiorentino, with Maria Callas and Francesco Albanese in the leading roles and Tullio Serafin conducting.  More recently, performances were given in Aix-en-Provence in 1988, with June Anderson, Rockwell Blake, Raúl Giménez, under conductor Gianfranco Masini, and at the Rossini Opera Festival in 1993, with Renée Fleming and Gregory Kunde, under conductor Daniele Gatti.

The United States premiere was given in Tulsa, Oklahoma on 29 February 1992 in celebration of the 200th anniversary of Rossini's birth with a cast the included Christine Weidinger in the title role, Thomas Young as Rinaldo, and Ronald Naldi as Ubaldo. A conjoint production by Tulsa Opera, Tulsa Ballet, and the Tulsa Philharmonic, the work was staged by Nicholas Muni, designed by John Boesche, conducted by Richard Bradshaw, and recorded for national broadcast on NPR. The Metropolitan Opera premiere took place on 12 April 2010, with Renée Fleming in the title role.

Armida was performed at the Rossini Opera Festival in Pesaro in August 2014 in a new production by Luca Ronconi.

Roles

Synopsis
Time:  The Crusades
Place: Near Jerusalem

Act 1
Goffredo, commander of the Christian forces, comforts and rallies the Frankish soldiers, who are mourning the recent death of their leader. A noblewoman appears and introduces herself as the rightful ruler of Damascus. She claims that her throne has been usurped by her evil uncle Idraote and asks for help and protection. In fact she is the sorceress Armida and in league with Idraote, who has entered with her in disguise. Their plan is to weaken the Crusaders by enslaving some of their best soldiers. The men are so dazzled by Armida's beauty that they convince Goffredo to help her. Goffredo decides that the Franks must choose a new leader, who will then pick ten soldiers to go with Armida. They elect Rinaldo, much to the jealousy of the knight Gernando ("Non soffrirò l'offesa"). Armida and Rinaldo, who is the Crusaders’ best soldier, had met once before, and she is secretly in love with him. She now confronts him and reminds him how she saved his life on that occasion. When she accuses him of ingratitude, he admits that he's in love with her (Duet: "Amor… possente nome!"). Gernando sees them together and insults Rinaldo as a womanizer in front of the other men. They duel and Rinaldo kills Gernando. Horrified by what he has done, he escapes with Armida before Goffredo can punish him.

Act 2
Astarotte, one of the princes of Hell, has led a group of demons into a forest to help Armida. She arrives there with Rinaldo, who's completely enthralled by her (Duet: "Dove son io!"). Even when she tells him about Idraote's plot, he doesn't turn against her. To Rinaldo's amazement, Armida then turns the forest into a vast pleasure palace. Armida muses on the power of love ("D’Amore al dolce impero") and offers for Rinaldo's entertainment a pantomime about a warrior being seduced by nymphs. Rinaldo, having lost all thoughts of military honor, gives himself over to Armida's enchantment.

Act 3
Two of Rinaldo's fellow knights, Ubaldo and Carlo, have been sent on a mission to save him. When they arrive in Armida's enchanted gardens, they are overwhelmed by the beauty of them, even though they know it's all an illusion. With the help of a magical golden staff, they ward off the nymphs that try to seduce them, then hide when Rinaldo and Armida appear. Rinaldo is still captivated by the sorceress, but once he is alone, Ubaldo and Carlo confront him. When they show him his reflection in a shield, he's horrified to realize that he no longer recognizes himself as the honorable warrior he once was (Trio: "In quale aspetto imbelle"). Still torn by his love for Armida, Rinaldo prays for strength, then leaves with his comrades. Armida calls upon the powers of Hell to bring her lover back but finds herself helpless. She rushes off in pursuit of the men.

Armida reaches the three soldiers before they can sail away. She begs Rinaldo not to desert her and even offers to go into battle with him. Ubaldo and Carlo restrain Rinaldo, trying to bolster his strength, and ultimately drag him away from her. Armida struggles between love and desire for revenge ("Dove son io?… Fuggì!"). She chooses revenge, destroying the pleasure palace and flying away in a rage.

Celebrated numbers
Sinfonia

Act 1
"Sventurata! Or che mi resta?" - quartetto (Armida, Eustazio, Goffredo and Idraote)
"Amor ! Possente nome !" - duetto (Rinaldo and Armida)
"Se pari agli accenti" - duetto (Rinaldo and Gernando)

Act 2
"D'amore al dolce impero" - rondo finale secondo (Armida) 
Danza e coro generale

Act 3
"In quale aspetto imbelle" - terzetto (Rinaldo, Ubaldo, and Carlo)
"Se al mio crudel tormento" - rondo finale terzo (Armida)

Recordings

References

Sources
Gossett, Philip; Brauner, Patricia (2001), " Armida " in Holden, Amanda (ed.), The New Penguin Opera Guide, New York: Penguin Putnam. 
Osborne, Charles (1994), The Bel Canto Operas of Rossini, Donizetti, and Bellini, London: Methuen; Portland, Oregon: Amadeus Press.  
Osborne, Richard (1990), Rossini, Ithaca, New York: Northeastern University Press. 
Osborne, Richard (1998), "Armida", in  Stanley Sadie, (Ed.),  The New Grove Dictionary of Opera, Vol. One, p. 199. London: Macmillan Publishers, Inc. 
Osborne, Richard (2004), "Rossini's Life", in Emanuele Senici (Ed.) The Cambridge Companion to Rossini, Cambridge University Press. .
Servadio, Gaia (2003),  Rossini,  New York: Carroll & Graf Publishers, 2003. 
Toye, Francis (re-issue 1987), Rossini: The Man and His Music, Dover Publications, 1987. ,

External links

 Piano reduction (vocal) score of Armida at IMSLP
 Libretto of Armida
 List of i instrumentation used in Armida

Operas by Gioachino Rossini
Italian-language operas
1817 operas
Operas
Operas set in the Levant
Operas based on works by Torquato Tasso
Opera world premieres at the Teatro San Carlo
Works about the Crusades
Cultural depictions of Godfrey of Bouillon